The Dinah Shore Trophy Award is an annual award introduced in 1994 in honor of Dinah Shore that is given to one of the top collegiate female golfers.

The award, which is administered by the LPGA Foundation and presented by the National Golf Coaches Association (NGCA), recognizes a female collegiate golfer who excels in both academics (GPA of at least 3.2 on a 4.0 scale) and athletics – playing in at least 50 percent of the team's scheduled events – while maintaining a 78.00 or less scoring average. The nominees must also demonstrate outstanding leadership skills and community service.

The Dinah Shore Trophy Award is a part of the Dinah Shore Scholarship Fund, a cooperative effort between the LPGA Foundation, the Friends of Golf (FOG), and the Nabisco Dinah Shore, one of the LPGA's four major championships and the largest contributor to the Dinah Shore Scholarship Fund. A donation of $10,000 is given to the women's golf program of the recipient's institution.

Winners

See also
 List of sports awards honoring women

References

Golf awards in the United States
College golf in the United States
College sports trophies and awards in the United States
Women's golf in the United States
Sports awards honoring women
Student athlete awards in the United States